Hori I, son of Kama, was Viceroy of Kush under Siptah and is attested in year 6 of that king. He likely continued to serve under Twosret, Setnakhte, and Ramesses III. Hori's titles include: King's Son of Kush, First charioteer of His Majesty, and King's messenger to every land.  Hori I was succeeded by his son who was also called Hori.

Hori's tomb was found in Tell Basta.

References

12th-century BC Egyptian people
Viceroys of Kush
People of the Twentieth Dynasty of Egypt
Nineteenth Dynasty of Egypt